Ethmia kirbyi is a moth in the family Depressariidae. It is found in Haiti and Puerto Rico.

The ground color of the forewings is white with gray-brown markings. The ground color of the hindwings is white, becoming brownish toward the apex. Adults are on wing in February (in Haiti) and in April and August (in Puerto Rico).

References

Moths described in 1890
kirbyi